Kodamthuruth is a village in Alappuzha district in the Indian state of Kerala.
It is a panchayat, which comes under the Aroor Assembly constituency.

Demographics
Kodamthuruth is a town in the district of Alappuzha, Kerala. The Kodamthuruth town has a population of 21,295; of which 10,365 are males, while 10,930 are females as per a report released by Census India 2011. 

The population of Children between the ages of 0-6 is 1,828, which is 8.58% of the total population of Kodamthuruth. In the town, the female sex ratio is 1,055 against the state average of 1,084. The child sex ratio in Kodamthuruth is around 1,036 compared to the Kerala state average of 964. The literacy rate of the town is 94.44%, higher than the state average of 94.00 %. In Kodamthuruth, male literacy is around 97.25%, while female literacy rate is 91.78%. 

Kodamthuruth has administration over 5,130 houses, to which it supplies basic amenities like water and sewer coverage.

Schools
 Kodamthuruthu LP school
 Kodamthuruthu VV Higher Secondary School
 Chammanadu ECEK Union School
Government Upper Primary School Changaram
 St.Antony's Government Lower Primary School, Ezhupunna South

References

Villages in Alappuzha district